Roméo Lorrain (May 26, 1901 – July 6, 1967) was a politician Quebec, Canada and a nine-term Member of the Legislative Assembly of Quebec (MLA).

Early life
He was born on May 26, 1901 in Buckingham, Quebec (now Gatineau, Quebec) and became a farmer. Lorrain was a journalist and a business person.

Political career

He ran as an Action libérale nationale candidate in the district of Papineau in the 1935 provincial election and won. He joined Maurice Duplessis's Union Nationale and was re-elected in the 1936, 1939, 1944, 1948, 1952, 1956, 1960 and 1962 elections. He did not run for re-election in the 1966 election and was succeeded again by Roland Théorêt.

Lorrain was appointed to the Cabinet in 1944, serving as Minister of Public Works until 1960.

Death

He died on July 6, 1967.

Footnotes

1901 births
1967 deaths
Action libérale nationale MNAs
Politicians from Gatineau
Union Nationale (Quebec) MNAs